Max Velmans (born 27 May 1942 in Amsterdam) is a British psychologist and Emeritus Professor of Psychology at Goldsmiths, University of London, principally known for the theory of consciousness called "reflexive monism".

Reflexive monism bridges the materialist/dualist divide by noting that, in terms of their phenomenology, experiences of the external world are none other than the physical world-as-experienced, thereby placing aspects of human consciousness in the external phenomenal world, rather than exclusively within the head or brain. A similar point of departure is adopted in much of European phenomenology. The theory then explores the consequences of this point of departure for a different understanding of various conventional ways of distinguishing mental from physical phenomena, such as internal versus external phenomena, private versus public phenomena, subjective versus objective phenomena, and the world-as-experienced versus the world as described by physics. The theory also combines facets of realism (for the existence of reality per se),  with idealism (for the existence of the phenomenal world), which falls short of avowing the necessity of perception to the existence of reality per se (the principle of "esse est percipi").

Velmans has around 100 publications in the area of consciousness studies in which he develops this basic point of departure into a general theory that addresses the many problems of consciousness, including Understanding Consciousness (2000, 2009), and Towards a Deeper Understanding of Consciousness (2017). In his map of prominent theories of consciousness Francisco Varela categorises Velmans' work as non-reductionist, stressing the importance of first-person accounts of the phenomenology of consciousness, as well as third-person accounts of brain states and functions, which in Velmans' work are thought of as complementary.

Biography 
Born in Amsterdam, Velmans grew up in Sydney, Australia. After attending Sydney Boy's High School, he studied Electrical Engineering at St. Andrews College at the University of Sydney, where he received his B.Eng in 1963. In the evening he attended psychology classes at the University of Sydney for another two years, before moving to Europe. After several years of research and development he received his PhD in Psychology from Bedford College in 1974.

After his graduation in 1963 Velmans had started his career designing electrical circuits at the electronics laboratory of the Australian engineering company EMAIL Ltd. After half a year he moved to systems analyses of business and industrial systems at the new information technology department. After touring through Europe in 1966 he became affiliated with Bedford College, University of London to pursue research for his PhD. In 1968 he was appointed to a lectureship in the new Psychology Department at Goldsmiths College, University of London, eventually to a personal chair in Psychology, and from 2006 to Emeritus Professor of Psychology.  	 	

Velmans co-founded the Consciousness and Experiential Psychology Section of the British Psychological Society in 1994, and served as its chair from 2003 to 2006. He was appointed National Visiting Professor for 2010–2011 by the Indian Council of Philosophical Research, and in 2011 was elected to a Fellowship of the British Academy of Social Sciences.

Work

Understanding Consciousness
Velmans' Understanding Consciousness (2000, 2009) is a comprehensive summary of his theoretical work, and introduces the idea of "reflexive monism."

Reflexive monism presents itself as an alternative to both dualism and reductionism.  It states that it does not make sense to speak of phenomenological experiences of reality as occurring solely within the brain, given that some of them quite clearly occur within the experienced world itself (for example, asked to point to an external light as-experienced, almost all rational subjects would point to the light that is experienced rather than to the brain, which is where, according to dualists and reductionists, the experience actually takes place).  Thus, Velmans argues, the relationship between subjects and experienced reality is reflexive: some experiences apprehended by the subject are quite clearly placed "in the world" by the perceiving mind.  The contents of consciousness are, thus, not exclusively in the brain, but often in the perceived physical world itself; in fact, in terms of phenomenology, there is no clear and distinct difference between what we normally think of as the "physical world", the "phenomenal world" and the "world as perceived". He writes:

This sketch of how consciousness fits into the wider universe supports a form of non-reductive, Reflexive Monism. Human minds, bodies and brains are embedded in a far greater universe. Individual conscious representations are perspectival. That is, the precise manner in which entities, events and processes are translated into experiences depends on the location in space and time of a given observer, and the exact mix of perceptual, cognitive, affective, social, cultural and historical influences which enter into the 'construction' of a given experience. In this sense, each conscious construction is private, subjective, and unique. Taken together, the contents of consciousness provide a view of the wider universe, giving it the appearance of a 3D phenomenal world. ... However, such conscious representations are not the thing-itself. In this vision, there is one universe (the thing-itself), with relatively differentiated parts in the form of conscious beings like ourselves, each with a unique, conscious view of the larger universe of which it is a part. In so far as we are parts of the universe that, in turn, experience the larger universe, we participate in a reflexive process whereby the universe experiences itself."

Changing Places
The changing places thought experiment is one of many conceived by Velmans, discussed in Understanding Consciousness. The experiment was designed to demonstrate the difficulties in distinguishing phenomenologically between a "subjective" first-person experience of a given event or object and a third-person "objective" observation of the same event or object. It also throws doubt on the supposed contrast between the "subjectivity" of a subject's experience and the supposed "objectivity" of an external observer's observations of the neural correlates of that experience in the subject's brain.

Velmans conceives of a situation in which an experimenter ("E") is observing a subject ("S") exposed to a light stimulus.  The differences between the two viewpoints, Velmans argues, is primarily derived from a difference in interest, reflected in a difference in their required activities.  To explain, during the experiment S is required only to report on her experiences of the light, which she needs to communicate to E in an appropriate manner.  E, on the other hand, is interested primarily in S's experience of the light, and thus E's focus is not just on the light (which he thinks of as a "stimulus") but also on the observable events in S's brain, and on S's reports concerning what she experiences.  Thus, E is interested first and foremost in the subject's experience, and how these relate to the light stimulus and brain states of S that he can observe.  In such a case, E's experience of events would be considered "objective" or "public", while S's experiences are "subjective" and "private"; while E's focus is on recording the neural causes and correlates of visual experiences, S is interested only in reporting about such experiences.

However, Velmans points out that all that would be required for S and E to exchange roles is for them to change their respective foci (as he puts it "S and E merely have to turn their heads"), so that E focuses exclusively on the light and reports his experiences, while S focuses her attention not just on the light, but on the events in E's brain and his reports of the experience. In such a situation, S becomes the experimenter and E becomes the subject; thus, following current conventions, "S would now be entitled to think of her observations (of the light and E's brain) as 'public and objective' and to regard E's experiences of the light as 'private and subjective'."

Velmans points out that this outcome is patently absurd, as the phenomenology of the light (that is, the way it is experienced) remains the same from the perspective of S or E, whether it is thought of as being an observed stimulus or a subjective experience. Nothing has changed in the nature of the light that either party can observe, save in the contextualising focus of their interests. That is, Velmans concludes, there is no phenomenological difference between publicly observed phenomena and private, subjective experiences. This becomes a point of departure for a more nuanced analysis of subjectivity, intersubjectivity and objectivity, and ultimately for an epistemology for the study of consciousness that, according to Velmans, fits psychology smoothly into science.

Selected publications
Velmans is the author and editor of numerous books and papers on consciousness, including the following:

 Consciousness (Critical Concepts in Psychology) Major Works Series (4 Volumes) (Routledge, 2018)
 Towards a Deeper Understanding of Consciousness (Routledge, 2017)
 Understanding Consciousness (Routledge/Psychology Press, London, 2000), edition 2 (Routledge/Psychology Press, London, 2009)
 The Blackwell Companion to Consciousness (jointly edited with Susan Schneider - Blackwell, 2007)
 The Blackwell Companion to Consciousness Second Edition (jointly edited with Susan Schneider, Wiley-Blackwell, 2017)
 How Could Conscious Experiences Affect Brains? (Imprint, 2003)
 Investigating Phenomenal Consciousness (John Benjamins, 2000)
 The Science of Consciousness: Psychological, Neuropsychological and Clinical Reviews (Routledge, 1996)

References

External links 

 Velmans' website including list of selected publications with brief descriptions
Velmans' lecture on "The Unconscious Ground of Being", Cortona, Italy, 2009.
Velmans lecture on "The Ancient History and Future of Consciousness Studies", Chesham, UK, 2019 

1942 births
Living people
British psychologists
Academics of Goldsmiths, University of London